The Luncavița (also known as Cetățuia in its upper course) is a river in Romania, tributary of the Gârla Ciulineț, which flows into the Danube. Its source is in the Măcin Mountains. It flows into the Gârla Ciulineț near the village Luncavița.

References

Rivers of Romania
Rivers of Tulcea County